The 19th Light Dragoons was a cavalry regiment of the British Army created in 1781 for service in British India. The regiment served in India until 1806, and in North America during the War of 1812, and was disbanded in Britain in 1821.

History

Great Britain
On 25 April 1779 warrants were issued to raise three regiments of light dragoons, the 19th, 20th and 21st, to address potential French aggression during the American Revolutionary War. The 19th was made up of drafts from the 1st and 2nd Dragoon Guards and the 4th and 10th Dragoons. The 19th did not see overseas service and was disbanded in June 1783.

India

The regiment was raised by Colonel Sir John Burgoyne (a cousin of General John Burgoyne) as the 23rd Regiment of Light Dragoons on 24 September 1781 for service in India. There had been no European cavalry to that date in India, and successive commanders there had called upon the regular British Army to supply a cavalry unit. The regiment arrived at Fort St. George, Madras in 1782 and became the first British cavalry regiment to serve in India. In 1786, the regiment was renumbered as the 19th Regiment of Light Dragoons.

The 19th played a major role in the Anglo-Mysore Wars and Anglo-Maratha Wars. Their first campaign was against Tipu Sultan of Mysore from 1790 to 1792. After defeating Tipu, the 19th were on garrison duty until 1799 when war broke out with Tipu again. This time, the Sultan was killed during the Siege of Seringapatam in May 1799.

In 1800, the 19th fought Dhondia Wagh's rebel army and in 1803, led by Major-General Arthur Wellesley (who later became the Duke of Wellington), they participated in the Battle of Assaye in September 1803. In this battle, the outnumbered British troops defeated a Maratha army and the regiment was subsequently awarded the battle honour of "Assaye" and presented with an honorary colour.

The 19th Light Dragoons then spent time garrisoning various British outposts. They were stationed at Cheyloor in 1802, at Arcot in 1803, in Bombay in 1804, and at Arcot again from 1805 to 1806. The regiment was summoned to Vellore on the night of 10 July 1806 to rescue the 69th Regiment of Foot who had been the victims of a revolt by Indian sepoys.

North America
The regiment embarked for England on 20 October 1806, and remained in Britain until the outbreak of the war with the United States in 1812. The 19th were one of three British regular cavalry units that served in North America during the War of 1812, and the only one to serve in Canada. (The 14th Light Dragoons served on campaign in New Orleans but had no horses,  The 6th Inniskilling Dragoons served on the East coast of the United States.) The regiment's first three squadrons arrived at Quebec City in May 1813 and were mounted on horses procured in Lower Canada.

Two squadrons were sent to Upper Canada where they were involved in the blockade and re-capture of Fort George, and the destruction of Black Rock and Buffalo in New York State. Elements of the two squadrons participated in Colonel Thomas Pearson's delaying action against Brigadier General Winfield Scott's brigade during the American invasion of 1814. They subsequently fought at the Battle of Chippawa in July 1814, the Battle of Lundy's Lane later in the month and the Siege of Fort Erie in August 1814. Another troop pursued American raiders who had struck at Battle of Malcolm's Mills in November 1814. For these actions, the regiment earned the battle honour of "Niagara".

The other squadron had been stationed south of Montreal at The Halfway house (Saint Luc area as well as Fort Lennox and The Block houses along the Lacolle border) and participated in the Battle of Plattsburgh in September 1814. In the autumn of 1814, the two squadrons serving on the Niagara rejoined the other squadron. The regiment served south of Montreal until the end of the war. They were sent back to England in August 1816.

Disbandment

The 19th Light Dragoons were re-equipped as lancers in September 1816 and renamed the 19th Lancers. The regiment remained in Britain until it was disbanded on 10 September 1821 due to reductions in size of the British Army. In 1862, the 19th Hussars were created and given permission to inherit the battle honours of the 19th Light Dragoons.

Regimental Colonels
Colonels of the regiment were:

23rd Regiment of (Light) Dragoons  (1781)
1781–1785: Sir John Burgoyne, Bt.

19th Regiment of (Light) Dragoons (1786)
1786–1814: Gen. Sir William Howe, 5th Viscount Howe, KB
1814–1815: Gen. Sir William Payne, Bt.

19th Regiment of (Light) Dragoons (Lancers) (1816)
1815–?1821: Gen. Sir John Ormsby Vandeleur, GCB
1821: Regiment disbanded

Notes

References

External links
19th Light Dragoons in the War of 1812
Uniforms of the 19th Light Dragoons
19th Light Dragoons at FIBIS
19th Light Dragoons re-enactment group

Cavalry regiments of the British Army
Light Dragoons
Dragoons
19th Light Dragoons officers
1781 establishments in Great Britain
1821 disestablishments in the United Kingdom
Military units and formations established in 1781
Military units and formations disestablished in 1821
British military units and formations of the War of 1812